Oswaldo Javier Sánchez Ibarra (born 21 September 1973) is a Mexican former professional footballer who played as a goalkeeper and a sports analyst for Televisa Deportes. He is highly regarded as one of the best goalkeepers in Mexican football history.

At the 2005 Confederations Cup, despite finishing in fourth place, Sánchez won the Golden Glove of the tournament, becoming the second Mexican to win a FIFA Confederations Cup Award.

Club career

Early career
Oswaldo Sánchez debuted as a substitute when the starting keeper was injured with Atlas at the age of 20 on October 30, 1993, against Veracruz where the teams tied the game at 1–1. Two years after his debut, he was a starter on the team and led Atlas to the Quarterfinals where they were eliminated by C.D. Veracruz. In the summer of 1996, Sánchez was transferred to Club América. The following season, Sánchez was benched and replaced as goalkeeper by Hugo Pineda. Sánchez played three out of 19 games, including the quarterfinals where América was eliminated by Monarcas Morelia. The following season, Sánchez went back into the starting line-up and led América. In the summer of 1999, Sánchez left América for rival Chivas de Guadalajara.

Guadalajara
At Guadalajara, Sánchez became the team's captain. Sánchez became a key player to Chivas along with other players. This was during the time when Guadalajara were at their best. Sánchez's extraordinary goalkeeping skills and leadership helped Guadalajara reach the finals of the Clausura 2004 season, but Chivas ultimately lost to UNAM via penalty-shootout. Eventually, Sánchez captured his long-awaited league title with Guadalajara during the Apertura 2006 season. After his 2006 championship with Chivas, Sanchez left the club after not being able to reach an agreement on his contract. He decided that the club directors did not want him there anymore and chose to play with Santos Laguna over Tigres UANL. Sánchez scored a goal in the 2000 Copa Merconorte match against Club Deportivo El Nacional of Ecuador, a header from a set piece in injury time to make the final score 3-3.

Santos Laguna
In 2007, he signed a contract onto Santos Laguna and he has played against his ex-team and ex-team members Chivas de Guadalajara in a 3–2 loss. In the first season with Santos, Sanchez along with his teammates saved the team from relegation. He led them to the Quarterfinals of the Clausura 2007 tournament after coming back from an injury earlier that season. He also led his team to 2nd place in both the Apertura and the Clausura in 2010. Sánchez led the team to win the Clausura 2008 championship and Clausura 2012.

After 21 years, Sánchez retired after the Apertura 2014 season winning the Copa MX in his final season.

International career

Sánchez was called up by Juan de Dios Castillo to participate at the 1993 FIFA World Youth Championship. He made his debut for the senior national team in 1996, against Bolivia. He has been part of three FIFA World Cups, in France 1998, 2002 and 2006. Coach Ricardo La Volpe called up Sánchez once again on April 2, 2006, to be the starting goalkeeper for Mexico in the 2006 FIFA World Cup in Germany. During preparation for the 2006 World Cup, Sánchez' father died of a heart attack on June 7, age 56. Sánchez flew home to Guadalajara, but he returned to Germany in time for the team's first game against Iran, which they won by a score of 3–1.

In 2007, he was called up by coach Hugo Sánchez to play in the Gold Cup and 2007 Copa América. Sánchez was selected to represent Mexico in friendlies against Ghana national team and China national team, his first callup since the 2007 Copa América.

Sánchez was not called up to the World Cup 2010 and did not play a single match for the Mexico national team in 2010. He played his 99th and last international match for Mexico on October 11, 2011, in a 2–1 loss to Brazil. He was substituted by Alfredo Talavera in the 88th minute, marking his official national football retirement.

Honours 
Guadalajara
Mexican Primera División: Apertura 2006

Santos Laguna
Mexican Primera División: Clausura 2008, Clausura 2012
Copa MX: Apertura 2014

Mexico
CONCACAF Gold Cup: 1996, 2003

Individual
Footballer with most penalty shots saved in the Mexican Primera División (25).
Mexican Primera División Golden Glove: 1995–96, 2000 Invierno, 2002 Apertura, 2003, 2003–04, 2004–05, 2005 Apertura
Mexican Primera División Golden Ball: 2003–04, 2005 Apertura
CONCACAF Gold Cup Golden Glove: 2003
CONCACAF Gold Cup Best XI: 2003
FIFA Confederations Cup Golden Glove: 2005
CONCACAF Champions League Golden Glove: 2012–2013

Personal life
Sánchez appeared on the front cover of the North American edition of the FIFA Football 2005 video game.

In 2016, Santos Laguna erected a statue of Sánchez.

References

External links
 
 
 
 
 
 Oswaldo Sánchez at FootballDatabase.com

1973 births
Living people
Footballers from Guadalajara, Jalisco
Mexican footballers
Association football goalkeepers
Atlas F.C. footballers
C.D. Guadalajara footballers
Club América footballers
Santos Laguna footballers
Liga MX players
Olympic footballers of Mexico
Mexico under-20 international footballers
Mexico international footballers
1996 CONCACAF Gold Cup players
Footballers at the 1996 Summer Olympics
1997 FIFA Confederations Cup players
1998 FIFA World Cup players
2002 FIFA World Cup players
2003 CONCACAF Gold Cup players
2004 Copa América players
2005 FIFA Confederations Cup players
2006 FIFA World Cup players
2007 CONCACAF Gold Cup players
2007 Copa América players
CONCACAF Gold Cup-winning players
Pan American Games medalists in football
Pan American Games silver medalists for Mexico
Medalists at the 1995 Pan American Games
Footballers at the 1995 Pan American Games